The Lovvers LP is the debut studio album by Canadian noise rock band AIDS Wolf, released in 2006.

Track listing 
 "Spit Tastes Like Metal" - 2:04
 "Chinese Roulette" - 1:21
 "We Multiply" - 1:49
 "The Hat Collector" - 2:38
 "Vampire King" - 1:52
 "Panty Mind" - 2:05
 "Opposing Walls" - 1:33
 "Some Sexual Drawings" - 11:45

2006 albums
AIDS Wolf albums